Levi Karuhanga (24 February 1956 – 21 April 2016) was a major general in Uganda. He was the Chairman of the UPDF General Court Martial, one of the highest military courts in the Uganda People's Defence Force (UPDF). He was appointed to that position in June 2014 by Yoweri Museveni, the commander in chief of the UPDF and the president of Uganda. He replaced Moses Ddiba Ssentongo whose one-year tenure at the court had expired. Before that, Karuhanga served as the Commander of the Reserve Force in the UPDF.

Background
Karuhanga was born in Bushenyi District in the Western Region of Uganda on 24 February 1956. He studied at Nyamitoma, Bweranyangi, and Mwengura Primary Schools. He then joined Mbarara High School, from where he moved to Nairobi, Kenya, where he graduated with a diploma in international studies.

He joined the Ugandan Bush War around 1981 in Luweero District. His recruitment number was RO/057, the 57th recruit of the then new rebel force. He fought throughout the war until the National Resistance Army captured power in 1986. Over the past 25 years, he has undergone military training including the following courses:
 Strategic Military Studies at the Egyptian Military Academy in Cairo
 Military Course at the China War College
 Military Course at the Armed Forces Command and Staff College, Jaji, Nigeria
 National Strategic Studies course from National Defence College, Kenya, from July 2006 until June 2007.
 Other military courses at military schools in Kenya and Uganda.

Military career
Karuhanga served in a number of assignments in the UPDF, including in the following positions:
 brigade commander in the UPDF 4th Division, between 1990 and 1992
 member of the UPDF Contingent and second in command of United Nations forces in Liberia, in 1994
 deputy commander of the 3rd UPDF Division, in 1998
 3rd Division commanding officer in 2001
 First Division commanding officer from 2005 until 2007
 In 2007, Karuhanga was appointed as the first commander of the African Union Mission to Somalia, serving in that capacity until 2008.
 In 2010, he was appointed commanding officer of the UPDF Reserve Force, serving there until June 2014, when he was given his last assignment.

Death
Levi Karuhanga died on 21 April 2016.

See also
 Andrew Gutti
 David Muhoozi
 Fred Tolit
 Ivan Koreta

References

External links
 Tolit Appeals for More Space for Court Martial

1956 births
2016 deaths
People from Bushenyi District
Ugandan military personnel
People from Western Region, Uganda
People educated at Mbarara High School
Ugandan generals
Egyptian Military Academy alumni